Sweitzer is the surname of the following people

People 
Jacob B. Sweitzer (1821–1881), was a Pennsylvania lawyer and soldier
Morgan Sweitzer (1891–1953), was a Colorado fruit cultivator
Sandi Sweitzer (born 1946), is an American former figure skater
Robert Sweitzer (1868–1938), was an American politician

Others 
Harold "Slim" Switzer (1925–1967) was an American child actor and child singer.
Carl "Alfalfa" Switzer (1927–1959) was an American actor and singer.

Ethnonymic surnames